Viktor Ivanovich Balashov (Russian: Виктор Иванович Балашов; 24 December 1924 – 23 June 2021) was a Soviet and Russian radio and television presenter. He was best known as the host for the USSR Union Radio, from 1944. From 1947 to 1991 he worked for the Soviet Central Television and its Russian successor. In 1997 he was awarded the People's Artist of Russia. Balashov was a veteran of the Second World War and was a member of the Red Army.

Balashov was also the Master of Sports of the USSR in Sambo and coached Anatoly Kharlampiyev. He also performed as a voice actor in documentaries and feature films.

He died on 23 June 2021 at the age of 96.

References

External links

  «Пока все дома»
 

1924 births
2021 deaths
Mass media people from Moscow
Moscow Art Theatre School alumni
Honored Artists of the RSFSR
People's Artists of Russia
Recipients of the Medal "For Courage" (Russia)
Recipients of the Medal of Zhukov
Recipients of the Order of Honour (Russia)
Recipients of the Order of the Red Star
Liberal Democratic Party of Russia politicians
Radio and television announcers
Russian male journalists
Russian male voice actors
Russian radio personalities
Russian sambo practitioners
Russian television presenters
Soviet journalists
Soviet male voice actors
Soviet television presenters
Burials in Troyekurovskoye Cemetery
Soviet military personnel of World War II